ENBau is an initiative of Swiss universities for training in sustainable building with the goal of resource efficiency of buildings in the areas of energy, water, materials and processes.

It is the goal of the participation of the Swiss Confederation to the sustainability of this initiative design skills in planning, construction and operation of real estate to promote and reinforce the building as a system is implemented. "ENBau" is the abbreviation for energy and sustainability in construction.

Organisation 
The initiative was founded in 2007 from the University Lucerne (HSLU) together with the Berne University of Applied Sciences, University of Applied Sciences Northwestern Switzerland (FHNW), Zurich University of Applied Sciences (ZHAW) and the University of Applied Sciences Chur (HTW Chur). Participation is also given from the Conference of Cantonal Energy Directors Switzerland (EnDK) and the Swiss Federal Office of Energy (BFE) in Berne. President of the leading Cooperation Council is Prof. Peter Schürch; director of the ENBau office for sustainable construction at University Lucerne (HSLU) is Christoph Wagener Ph.D..

Programme 
The aim of the initiative ENBau is a broad-based education campaign at higher levels in sustainable building, energy efficiency, renewable energies and the reduction of CO2 emissions based on the strategy of the 2000-watt society, the Swiss commitment to the Kyoto Protocol and the vision of the Green Building.

The organization of the study-programmes will be implemented through various modules, the academic qualifications are for the individual modules the CAS-degree (Certificate of Advanced Studies) and above all a "Master of Advanced Studies (MAS) in sustainable building." The individual modules are:

 Basics for sustainable construction
 Renewable energy
 Passive solar building design
 Building physics and Structural design for sustainable construction
 Facility management
 Architectural engineering
 Business Management, Project management and Process management
 Minergie / Minergie P-building concepts
 Efficient energy use in construction
 Multidisciplinary approach (feasibility study)

See also 

 2000-watt society
 One Watt Initiative
 Sustainable development
 Energy policy
 Low-energy house
 Minergie

External links
 ENBau

References

Energy conservation
Energy policy
Environmental design
Energy in Switzerland